Ersöz is a Turkish surname. Notable people with the surname include:
 Adnan Ersöz (1917–1991), Turkish general
 Levent Ersöz (born 1954), Turkish general
 Tufan Ersöz (born 1980), Turkish basketball player
 Gurbetelli Ersöz (1965–1997) Kurdish journalist

Turkish-language surnames